The short-crested coquette (Lophornis brachylophus) is a Critically Endangered species of hummingbird in the "coquettes", tribe Lesbiini of subfamily Lesbiinae. It is endemic to a small area of Mexico.

Taxonomy and systematics

The short-crested coquette is monotypic. At times it has been treated as conspecific with the rufous-crested coquette (L. delattrei).

Description

Both sexes have a short, straight, black bill. The adult male has a short rufous erectile crest; its longest feathers have green tips. It has emerald green upperparts with a white band between the back and the bronzy purple lower rump and green uppertail coverts. The throat is iridescent emerald green and the face features short orange cheek tufts tipped green. A white band separates the throat from the rest of the underparts, which are pale cinnamon. The central tail feathers are green and the rest reddish cinnamon with black tips. The adult female lacks the male's crest and cheek patches. Its forehead is dull cinnamon. Its upperparts are pale green; a buffy to whitish band separates the back from the dull green rump. The throat is whitish with a white band below it and the rest of the underparts are pale cinnamon. The central tail feathers are green with blackish tips and the rest cinnamon with a black bar near the end and pale buff tips. Immatures resemble the adult female.

Distribution and habitat

The short-crested coquette is found only in Mexico, in the extremely restricted range of a  stretch of the Atoyac-Paraíso-Puerto del Gallo road in the Sierra Madre del Sur mountains of Guerrero, Mexico, north-west of Acapulco. It inhabits semi-deciduous and humid evergreen forest, pine-oak forest, and plantations.

Behavior

Movement

The short-crested coquette is believed to be sedentary but some altitudinal movement is probable.

Feeding

The short-crested coquette feeds on small arthropods and on the nectar of a variety of small flowering plants. It catches insects by hawking from a perch. It defers to larger hummingbirds.

Breeding

The short-crested coquette's breeding season is probably from November to February, but nothing else is known about its breeding phenology.

Vocal and non-vocal sounds

The short-crested coquette is mostly silent. It gives a "high, sharp 'sip' or 'tsip'" while feeding and also "quiet dry chips 'chi..chi-chi..'." Its wings make "a low bee-like humming" when hovering. Few recordings of its vocalization have been published.

Status

The IUCN initially assessed the short-crested coquette as Endangered but since 2000 has rated it Critically Endangered. It has a very small known range, none of which is protected, and a population estimated to be less than 1000 mature individuals. The species is threatened by continuing habitat loss caused by land clearing for agriculture including illegal narcotic crops.

References

Lophornis
Endemic birds of Mexico
Natural history of Guerrero
Hummingbird species of Central America
Critically endangered biota of Mexico
Critically endangered fauna of North America
Birds described in 1949
Taxonomy articles created by Polbot
Birds of the Sierra Madre del Sur